Juan Núñez Lima (born September 19, 1959) is a retired Dominican athlete who competed in the sprints. He competed at the World Championships in Helsinki in 1983 in the 100 meters where he reached the final and finished 5th.

Anti-doping rule violation
At the 1983 Pan American Games Núñez was disqualified after testing positive for the stimulant Fencamfamine.

Achievements

References

External links

1959 births
Living people
Dominican Republic male sprinters
Athletes (track and field) at the 1988 Summer Olympics
Olympic athletes of the Dominican Republic
Athletes (track and field) at the 1983 Pan American Games
Athletes (track and field) at the 1987 Pan American Games
Pan American Games bronze medalists for the Dominican Republic
Pan American Games medalists in athletics (track and field)
World Athletics Championships athletes for the Dominican Republic
Doping cases in athletics
Dominican Republic sportspeople in doping cases
Central American and Caribbean Games silver medalists for the Dominican Republic
Central American and Caribbean Games bronze medalists for the Dominican Republic
Competitors at the 1982 Central American and Caribbean Games
Competitors at the 1986 Central American and Caribbean Games
Central American and Caribbean Games medalists in athletics
Medalists at the 1987 Pan American Games